Laura Manzanedo  is a Spanish actress and presenter of radio.

Biography 

She was born in Usera, Madrid (Spain) on 18 April 1976.

Laura studied Spanish dance in Real Escuela Superior de Danza e interpretación in the Real Escuela Superior de Arte Dramático of Madrid.

Her most important role as actress was as Clara in the TV serie: Al salir de clase (Telecinco). She was a lesbian student who fell in love with Miriam.

Yo soy Bea

The following year, in April 2008 she was first cover of the Interviú magazine. Three years later, in 2011, she Malasaña neighbourhood.

In January 2009, she joined as a presenter in the program Ponte A Prueba on Europa FM radio station. For his work on the radio, she has been dubbed Diva de la Noche.

In the second week of June 2014, she was on the cover of Interviú magazine. She was to support Spain national football team in Brazil World Cup.

References

External links 

 
 

Spanish actresses
Spanish radio people
1976 births
Living people